"True" plantains are a group of cultivars of the genus Musa (bananas and plantains) placed in the African Plantain subgroup of the AAB chromosome group. Although "AAB" and "true plantain" are often used interchangeably, plantains are just the most popular varieties among the AABs. The term "plantain" can refer to all the banana cultivars which are normally eaten after cooking, rather than raw (see cooking banana), or it can refer to members of other subgroups of Musa cultivars, such as the Pacific plantains, although in Africa there is little to no distinction made between the two, as both are commonly cooked. True plantains are divided into four groups based on their bunch type: French, French Horn, False Horn, and Horn plantains.

Each bunch type has a variety of cultivars associated with it:
 French cultivars: 'Obino l'Ewai' (Nigeria), 'Nendran' (India), 'Dominico' (Colombia)
 French Horn cultivars: 'Batard' (Cameroon), 'Mbang Okon' (Nigeria)
 False Horn cultivars: 'Agbagba' and 'Orishele' (Nigeria), 'Dominico-Harton' (Colombia)
 Horn cultivars: 'Ishitim' (Nigeria), 'Pisang Tandok' (Malaysia)
In the 1990s, the International Institute of Tropical Agriculture published two guides to help scientists and farmers identify plantains in West Africa and support their cultivation.
 The IITA Reference Guide for "Plantain cultivation under West African Conditions" (1990, page 14) contains photos of different plantain types.
 IITA's Research Guide 66 "Morphology and Growth of Plantain and Banana" (1997, page 10) contains figures of the plantain inflorescence types.

See also

References

Banana cultivars
.
Musaceae